Sachkhere is a town at the northern edge of the Imereti Province in Western Georgia. It is the center of the Sachkhere Municipality.  

Farming is a major contributor to the economy of Sachkhere. Alva LLC estimates that there are 4,000 small and medium-sized farms and ranches in the region, supported by a program of technical assistance sponsored by USAID and administered by the Farmer-to-Farmer program of CNFA.

Science

The microbiologist George Eliava (1892-1937) was born in Sachkhere.

Sport
Though small, Sachkhere is famous for having produced two Olympic weightlifting champions - Lasha Talakhadze and Giorgi Asanidze.

See also 
 Sachkhere Mountain Training School
 Imereti

References

Cities and towns in Imereti
Kutaisi Governorate
Populated places in Sachkhere Municipality